Edward Noël Walker  (28 April 1842 – 20 September 1908) was a British colonial administrator who served as acting Governor of British Ceylon. He was appointed on 24 October 1895 and was acting Governor until 10 February 1896. He was succeeded by Joseph West Ridgeway.

Walker was the son of Sir James Walker, also a colonial administrator, and Anne Brand. He was educated at Cheltenham College and Glasgow University.

References

Governors of British Ceylon
British expatriates in Sri Lanka
19th-century British people
1842 births
1908 deaths
Companions of the Order of St Michael and St George
Chief Secretaries of Ceylon
People educated at Cheltenham College
Alumni of the University of Glasgow